The BMW i Vision Dee is an electric concept car marketed by the German car manufacturer BMW. It is a model of the BMW i sub-brand.

History
On January 4, 2023, BMW presented the i Vision Dee at the Consumer Electronics Show in Las Vegas.

According to BMW CEO Oliver Zipse, the car "demonstrates the possibilities that the combination of hardware and software opens up." This allows the driver to use the digital potential. The central control is a mixed reality slider that transforms the windshield into a portal of digital experiences periodically. Shy-Tech technology touch sensors allow the vehicle owner to set digital content levels. In terms of dimensions, the model is close to the BMW 3 Series. To "communicate" with the driver, a voice assistant is built into the car. He expresses emotions not only with his voice, but also with lighting equipment. Instead of touch screens, there is a head-up display on the windshield. The car also changes color.

The i Vision Dee is planned to mass-produced in 2025.

References

i Vision Dee
Cars introduced in 2023